Oliwa, Gdańsk Archcathedral is a church in Oliwa, Gdańsk, Poland that is dedicated to the Holy Trinity. Also known as the Archcathedral Basilica of the Holy Trinity in Oliwa, Gdańsk.

Cathedral 
The archcathedral in Oliwa is a three-nave basilica with a transept and a multisided closed presbytery, finished with an ambulatory. The façade is flanked by two slender towers, 46-metres tall each with sharply-edged helmets. It is enlivened by a Baroque portal from 1688, as well as three windows of different sizes and three cartouches. The crossing of the naves is overlooked by a bell tower, a typical element of the Cistercian architecture. The cathedral is 17.7m high, 19m wide and 107m long (97.6m of the interior itself), which makes it the longest Cistercian church in the world. It holds works of art in Renaissance, Baroque, Rococo and Classical style of great artistic value.

Historical outline 
 1186 – 2 July, Sambor I of Gdańsk (son of Subisław I), Duke of Pomerania, founded the Cistercian monastery named “Beatae Mariae de Oliva” or “ad montem Olivarum”, and from 12th century “Monasterium sanctae dei genitricis et virginis Mariae de Oliva”.
 1224 – during the pagan Prussians crusade the first Romanesque oratory was burnt. The church was rebuilt and extended in 1234 (or 1236) to be soon destroyed by another Prussian crusade.
 1350 – fire that was caused by chimney soot excess completely consumed both the church and the monastery. The present shape of both of those buildings date back to the second half of the 14th century.
 1577 – during the rebellion of the city of Gdańsk the Gdańsk mercenary army attacked the monastery and burned it to the ground. The church was rebuilt between 1578 and 1583.
 1594 – 14 August, Hieronim Rozdrażewski, a bishop from Włocławek consecrated the church
 1831 – Prussian authorities closed down the Cistercian monastery in Oliwa. The church, together with some of the buildings belonging to it, was handed over to a Catholic parish.
 1925 – under a papal bull issued on December 30, Pope Pius XI established the Diocese of Gdańsk and by that raised the Oliwa church to the dignity of a cathedral. Oliwa became the capital of the diocese and a seat of bishops.
 1976 – 8 July, the church was raised to the dignity of a minor basilica by the decision of Pope Paul VI.
 1992 – 25 March, Pope John Paul II issued a bull by which he established the Archdiocese of Gdańsk with the seat in Oliwa and raised the basilica to the dignity of an archcathedral.

Interior design 

All 23 altars of the cathedral are of great historical value. They are mainly Baroque and Rococo, partly made of marble. Their iconography depicts the main principles of the post-Trent church. Most outstanding is the present High Altar (1688), which is the most profound Baroque work of art in Pomerania; and the Netherland Renaissance style altar, which until 1688 played the role of the main one. 
The paintings in the altars, presbytery and main nave were made by the famous 17th- century artists: Herman Han (1574–1628), Adolf Boy (1612-1680), Andrzej Stech (1635–1697) and Andreas Schlütera (1660–1714). 
The interior also holds Rococo chapels of the Holy Cross and St John of Nepomuk, an ambo, tombstones, epitaphs, the Pomeranian Dukes tomb, the Kos family tomb, bishop's crypt, antique chandeliers, canopies, and many other antiquities, including a feretory of great cultural value, showing Our Lady of Oliwa with an Infant Jesus. The feretory is always carried during the annual walking pilgrimage to the Calvary of Wejherowo. 
The archcathedral holds organ concerts all year round and the beautifully restored monastery (now belonging to Gdańsk Seminary) displays the collection of the Diocesan Museum. Oliwa Cathedral is a very important place for the Kashubian culture.

Oliwa organ

Great organ 

 1763–1788 : Johann Wilhelm Wulff (Orneta)
 1790–1793 : Friedrich Rudolf Dalitz (Gdańsk)
 1863–1865 : Friedrich Kaltschmidt (Szczecin)
 1934–1935 : Joseph Goebel (Gdańsk)
 1955 : Wacław Biernacki (Kraków)
 1966– 1968 : Zygmunt Kamiński (Warsaw)

18th and 19th century 
The famous great Oliwa organ was designed and constructed between the years 1763 and 1788 by Johann Wilhelm Wulff (Brother Michael, a Cistercian Monk). The instrument contained 83 registers (5100 pipes), 3 manual keyboards (also manuals; Hauptwerk– great organ, Oberwerk– main organ, Kronwerk– crown organ), one foot keyboard (pedal), mechanical tracker action, and 14 wedge-shaped bellows. The console was independently located in the central part of the matroneum, which was unusual in Northern Europe at that time. The organ front was decorated with Rococo sculptures and moveable angels holding bells, trumpets, stars and suns. At that time it was the largest organ in Europe and probably also in the whole world.

Between 1790 and 1793, by order of the new Abbot of Oliwa, a widely known Gdańsk organ master, Friedrich Rudolf Dalitz, undertook the difficult task of moving the console from the middle to the north wing of the matroneum, which was extremely complicated owing to the size of the instrument and the complexity of the tracker action system.

During the next major reconstruction (1863–1865), the great organ was given a Romantic layer. The work was carried out by an organ master from Szczecin- Friedric Kaltschmidt. Wulff's organ was enriched by a mechanical tracker action and 32 new registers. He left the 52 already existing ones (however, some of them were renewed) and all the front pipes. In accordance with the trend of the time, manual three (Kronwerk) was by Kaltschmidt enclosed into a swell box. The instrument now consisted of 84 registers assigned to 3 manuals and one pedal.

20th and 21st century 

Most significant changes in the structure of the instrument were made during the interwar period. Between 1934 and 1935, Gdańsk organ builder, Joseph Goebel extended the organ to 4 manuals and added a new electro-pneumatic tracker action with wind chests. He used 51 registers from those already existing, renewing some of them and adding some new ones. Moreover, he connected the choir organ to the main console. After completion of the work, the Oliwa organ had 82 standard registers and 5 transmitted ones.

After World War II, in 1955, the organ was thoroughly renovated by Wacław Biernacki from Cracow. 
The last overhaul of the instrument was so far done in 1966–1968, by the company of Zygmund Kamiński from Warsaw. He introduced a new disposition, added several missing pipes and a newly built positive, placed in the third arc in the west of the nave. Today the great Oliwa organ comprises 96 registers, 5 manuals, a pedal, an electro-pneumatic tracker action and also an electronic system recording up to 64 combinations (so-called Setzer type). All the present front pipes are still those made by Johann Wilhelm Wulff. The great organ is connected with the choir organ and is one of the biggest ones in Poland.

The post of the principal organist at the Oliwa Cathedral is currently held by professor Roman Perucki.

Demonstration concerto 
There is a twenty-minute concerto organized daily except for the principal feasts and a few other days as specified in the concerto schedule. You have to be in the cathedral before the hour given as the door may be closed during the concerto. Christian visitors usually say Our Father before they listen to the music.

Choir organ 
The choir organ, placed in the south wing of the transept, was built in 1680 by Johann Georg Wulff and comprised 14 registers.
In 1758 Johann Wilhelm Wulff conducted a thorough renovation of the organ, extending the disposition of the organ to 18 registers. Then in 1874, Carl Schuricht performed the organ restoration; however, no further details are recorded. 
In 1902 Berlin based company of brothers Oswald and Paul Dinse carried out further reconstruction of the organ, introducing a pneumatic tracker action and reducing the number of registers to 14 (2 manuals and a pedal).
When, between the years 1934–1935, Joseph Goebel was restoring the great organ, he also took care of the choir organ. It received a new electric tracker action and was connected to the main console. 
In 2003, a contemporary Emanuel Kemper 17-pipe organ with a mechanical and electric tracker action was imported from Germany. Afterwards, an organ builder Jerzy Kukla installed it in an antique organ case, thus, replacing the previous instrument. 
The choir organ is at present connected with the great organ.

References

External links 

 Archcathedral Basilica in Gdańsk Oliwa on old photographs
 The organs of Oliwa website

Roman Catholic churches in Gdańsk
Roman Catholic cathedrals in Poland
Kashubian culture
Tourist attractions in Gdańsk
Roman Catholic churches completed in 1594
16th-century Roman Catholic church buildings in Poland
The Most Holy Virgin Mary, Queen of Poland